Yermolino Airport (also given as Borovsk)  is an airport in Russia located  north-west of Balabanovo, Kaluga Oblast. It is a large airfield which mainly services propeller-driven aircraft. On June, 23 (2014) a triangular agreement between UTair Aviation, the Ministry of the Interior of the Russian Federation and the government of Kaluga Oblast was announced. According to the agreement the airport will be a new base for UTair Aviation. The existing infrastructure will be expanded in order to allocate up to 45 civil aircraft by 2017.

As of May 2019, these plans have not been implemented, the aerodrome retains its military status.

References

Airports built in the Soviet Union
Airports in Kaluga Oblast